Piperno is an Italian surname. Notable people with the surname include:

 Alessandro Piperno (born 1972), Italian writer and literary critic of Jewish descent
 Dolores Piperno, American archaeologist specializing in archaeobotany
 Franco Piperno (born 1943), Italian former communist militant
 Melissa Piperno (born 1984), Canadian ice dancer
 Reginald of Piperno, or Reginald of Priverno (ca 1230-ca 1290), Italian Dominican, theologian and companion of St. Thomas Aquinas

Italian-language surnames